Couvin is a city and municipality of Wallonia located in the province of Namur, Belgium.

On 1 January 2018 the municipality had 13,782 inhabitants. Couvin is the second largest municipality of Belgium by surface area, after Tournai.

The municipality consists of the following districts: Aublain, Boussu-en-Fagne, Brûly, Brûly-de-Pesche, Couvin, Cul-des-Sarts, Dailly, Frasnes-lez-Couvin, Gonrieux, Mariembourg, Pesche, Petigny, Petite-Chapelle, and Presgaux.

Transport
Couvin railway station provides the town with a rail link direct to Charleroi. The line terminates here; the next station is Mariembourg.

Tourism

There are a number of sites of interest to tourists in the municipality.

One end of the Chemin de Fer à vapeur des Trois Vallées heritage railway is at Mariembourg. The Brasserie des Fagnes brewery is also situated there.

Caves in the area include the Trou de l’Abîme and the Neptune Caves.

Wolfsschlucht I, known locally as "Hitler's Bunker", is located at Brûly-de-Pesche. It was used as one of Adolf Hitler's military headquarters during the Battle of France.

See also
 List of protected heritage sites in Couvin

References

External links
 
Official website

 
Cities in Wallonia
Municipalities of Namur (province)